Roop Mallik is an Indian biophysicist who works on nanoscale molecular motor proteins that transport material such as viruses, mitochondria, endosomes etc. inside living cells. The motors, such as kinesin and dynein generate forces of  pico-newton order to carry our various cellular processes namely cell division, vesicular transport, endocytosis, molecular tethering etc. His lab is working to understand how  motor proteins help in degradation and clearance of pathogens, and also how these motors work inside the liver to maintain systemic lipid homeostasis in the animal. Mallik is currently a professor at the Department of Biosciences and Bioengineering, Indian Institute of Technology Bombay (IIT Bombay).

Early life
Mallik was born in 1970 in Allahabad, situated in the Northern India state of Uttar Pradesh. His father is a machine design engineer and mother was a senior teacher.

Career
Mallik completed his post graduation in Physics in 1993 from Allahabad University. On the advice of his uncle, in 1994, he joined E. V. Sampathkumaran’s lab in Department of Condensed Matter Physics at Tata Institute of Fundamental Research, Mumbai for doctoral research . After the completion of his PhD with over 20 international articles, Mallik joined G. Krishnamoorthy (TIFR) and Jayant Udgaonkar's labs (NCBS) for short stint as post doctoral fellow. This small tenure introduced him to the world of biology. In 2002, he joined the lab of Steven Gross at Department of Developmental and Cell Biology, University of California, Irvine. In 2006 Mallik joined TIFR as assistant professor and became full professor in the Department of Biological Sciences. He moved from TIFR to the Indian Institute of Technology Bombay in 2020.

Personal life
Mallik is married to Dr. Sreelaja Nair, also a colleague at BSBE, IIT Mumbai. He is an avid outdoor enthusiast. He maintains a website of his travels and hikes.

Honors and awards
 Fellowship of the Indian National Science Academy (INSA) Delhi 
 Associate Membership of EMBO  (European Molecular Biology Organization) 
 DBT – Wellcome Trust India Alliance Senior Research Fellowship (January 2021 onwards)
 The G.D. Birla Award for Scientific Research, 2019 
 Infosys Prize in Life Sciences 2018 
 Shanti Swarup Bhatnagar Prize for Science and Technology, 2014
 Fellowship of the Indian Academy of Sciences (IAS) Bengaluru 
 Wellcome Trust – DBT India alliance Senior Research Fellowship (2013–2018)
 Wellcome Trust (UK) International Senior Research Fellowship (2006–2012) 
 Human Frontier Sciences Program HFSP Long-term Postdoctoral Fellowship

References

External links 
 Roop Malik's Home page

1970 births
Living people
Recipients of the Shanti Swarup Bhatnagar Award in Biological Science